Gaoling may refer to the following places in China:
 Gaoling District, an urban district in Xi'an, Shaanxi Province
 Gaoling, Shandong, a town in Shandong Province
 Gaoling, Beijing, a town in Beijing
 Gaoling Mausoleum, a tomb in Xigaoxue, Henan Province

See also 
 Gaol
 Gao Ling, Chinese badminton player